Thomas Jacob Haines (born 28 October 1998) is an English cricketer who plays for Sussex County Cricket Club. He is a left-handed top-order batsman who also bowls right-arm medium pace.

Career
Haines made his List A debut on 23 July 2021, for Sussex in the 2021 Royal London One-Day Cup. 

In September 2021, Haines became the first batsman to score 1,000 runs in the 2021 County Championship. He has attributed his improved form to increased practice.

In April 2022, in the 2022 County Championship, Haines scored his maiden double century in first-class cricket, with 243 runs against Derbyshire. Along with Cheteshwar Pujara, Haines became the first batters to score double centuries in the same innings of a first-class match while following-on. He made his Twenty20 debut on 3 July 2022, for Sussex in the 2022 T20 Blast.

References

External links
 

1998 births
Living people
Sportspeople from Crawley
English cricket captains 
Sussex cricket captains 
English cricketers
Sussex cricketers